According to the Hebrew Bible, the Asuppim (Biblical Hebrew: אֲסֻפִּים ʾĂsuppīm) was a location or set of locations in the Second Temple. The word appears to be a masculine plural noun formed of the root אספ gather, and is usually translated "storehouses". Levite guards were stationed at the Asuppim. In Nehemiah, the guards of the Asuppim are given as follows: Mattaniah, Bakbukiah, Obadiah, Meshullam, Talmon, and Akkub. In 1 Chronicles, the guarding of the Asuppim is given to "the sons of Obed-Edom" who guard it "two by two (שנים שנים)". John Lightfoot argues the Asuppim was located along the western wall of the Temple, though David Qimḥi, pseudo-Abraham b. David, David Altschuler, and Alexander Bennett M'Grigor put it to the south.

Etymology and translation

Proposal of ספפ 
Many early commentators, including pseudo-Solomon b. Isaac on Nehemiah, pseudo-Abraham b. Meir b. Ezra (Moses Qimḥi), Jacob b. Meir, pseudo-Saadia b. Joseph (pseudo-Benjamin b. Judah), and Isaiah di Trani, trace the root of Asuppim to ספפ terminate, for the translation "thresholds" or "entrances", as do Meir Leibush Wisser, Julius Bate, the King James Version to Nehemiah, and some moderns (see § Modern consensus). The Targum to 1 Chronicles translates Asuppim as שקפיא threshold, the same translation used for ספפ elsewhere. The Peshitta to Nehemiah is missing the last three words of 12:25, but the Peshitta to 1 Chronicles translates ܣ̈ܦܐ threshold. The Vulgate translates vestibulorum "entrances" (ספפ) in Nehemiah, which Loring Woart Batten, Paul Mankowski, and Jonas C. Greenfield accept. Confirmation for the classical conflation of אספ with ספפ or another root meaning "entrance structure" comes from Aramaic and Akkadian parallels and Dead Sea Scrolls, including the Temple Scroll, where אספ often means threshold.

Proposal of יספ 
Other early commentators, including pseudo-Solomon b. Isaac on b. Tamid, pseudo-Gershom b. Judah, pseudo-Abraham b. David (Baruch b. Isaac), pseudo-Asher b. Jehiel. and the Anonymous German Commentary to b. Tamid, traced Asuppim to יספ append, for "additions," so-named because they had been added (יספ) onto the larger structure. Yechezkel Kutscher agreed יספ was the root of Assupim but translated "additions [next to entrances]" (see § Akkadian loanword).

Proposal of אספ 
The Vulgate (only on 1 Chronicles) and some early commentators, including Levi b. Gershon and Menachem Meiri, held to the plain etymology אספ gather, for "assembly". Levi b. Gershon thought they were so-named because they were the places "where Levites gathered (אספ) to guard the gates," which Richard Brown accepts. Meiri thought they were so-called because "they were the places where the Levites gathered (אספ) to perform commandments". The translation of Asuppim as assembly (אספ) is used by the Vulgate for "assembly of elders" in 1 Chronicles (see below).

Immanuel Tremellius and most modern scholars, including Lightfoot, Julius Fürst, Carl Friedrich Keil, Herbert Edward Ryle, Wilhelm Gesenius, Charles Ellicott, Ernst Wilhelm Hengstenberg, Joshua Hughes-Games, Ernst Bertheau, George Williams, Charles Cutler Torrey, and Mitchell Dahood, use אספ gather but translate storehouses, where treasure or supplies were gathered (אספ); in support of this translation is 2 Chronicles 25:24, which describes "All the gold and the silver and all the vessels, which were found in the House of Yahweh with Obed-Edom", whose sons guard the Asuppim in 1 Chronicles. This is the approach of most modern translations and dictionaries (see § Modern consensus).

The Vulgate and some modern commentators, including Hengstenberg and Adolf Kamphausen, associate Asuppim with the Ba'alei Asuppoth (Hebrew: בַּעֲלֵי אֲסֻפּוֹת, usually translated "masters of anthologies (אספ)" but by the Vulgate, magistrorum concilium "masters of assemblies (אספ)" and by Hengstenberg, "authors in the library (אספ)"), mentioned Ecclesiastes 12:11. The words Asuppim and Asuppoth are etymological equivalents, and the use of the female suffix in Ecclesiastes enables a rhyme with dar'bonoth (דרבנות goads); variant Ba'alei Asuppim (בעלי אספים) is found in the poetry of Eleazar b. Kalir for a different rhyme. The Vulgate uses the connection to translate Asuppim seniorum concilium "assembly (אספ) of elders" in 1 Chronicles 26:15.

Mayer Sulzberger connects Asuppim to וַיֶּאֱסֹף and he gathered in Genesis 42:17, where Joseph "gathers" his brothers into prison, for the translation prison. Many translate Genesis 42:17's use of אספ gather "imprisoned" from context, but this usage is otherwise unique. Rabbinic commentators understand the use of אספ gather to imply that force was not used, and extrapolation is difficult because וַיֶּאֱסֹף wa-ye'esoph seems to be a deliberate pun on יוֹסֵף Yoseph. Onqelos, pseudo-Jonathan, and the Samaritan Targum render it כנש gathered, LXX has ἔθετο placed, the Vulgate has "tradidit" delivered, and the Peshitta has ܪܡܝ cast down, but Neofiti renders חבש imprisoned.

Akkadian loanword 
The Akkadian word asuppu, of unknown etymology but possibly related to ספפ terminate or יספ append, was first connected to the phonologically similar Asuppim by Godfrey Rolles Driver and this connection has since been widely acknowledged. Mankowski argues the QaTuL pattern of  אָסֹף asop, not indigenous to Biblical Hebrew for nouns, independently indicates that it is a loanword. However, David M. Clemens argues it might not be a loanword and could have formed from an indigenous QaTuL-pattern adjective which acquired a nominal usage. Corey Michael Peacock also rejects any connection between Asuppim and asuppu, arguing the contexts in Nehemiah and 1 Chronicles demand a gate-specific definition for Asuppim.

The Chicago Assyrian Dictionary defines asuppu as "a type of building erected of less durable materials than a house, used in outbuildings and on top of buildings." Mankowski suggests, for "less durable materials," bound reeds or thatch (compare Hebrew סוף sup "reeds" and Egyptian ṭwfi "reeds"). Heather D. Baker says asuppus were unroofed and notes that "[I]nsubstantial structures have occasionally been excavated within house courtyards" and "It is possible, but not certain, that these remains correspond to the Akkadian term asuppu." Peacock suggests asuppu is synonymous with the Biblical Hebrew סכה sukkah. Holger Gzella translates אָסֹף asop and Akkadian asuppu "gate area". Kutscher translates asuppu "additions next to entrances", Markham Geller, "vestibule", and David B. Weisberg, "attic room".

LXX and as a proper noun 
In place of the MT's Nehemiah 12:25, LXX has only ἐν τῷ συναγαγεῖν με τοὺς πυλωροὺς When I gathered the gatekeepers, apparently lacking all but the final two words of the verse and reading בְּאַסְּפִי הַשֹׁעֲרִים When I gathered the gatekeepers instead of MT בַּאֲסֻפֵּי הַשְּׁעָרִים . . . at the Asuppim of the gates. Esephim or ασαφείν (Alex.) Asaphein. David Altschuler and Alexander Bennett M'Grigor also assume Asuppim is a proper noun, as does pseudo-Solomon b. Isaac on 1 Chronicles. Pseudo-Solomon b. Isaac on 1 Chronicles is followed there by Abraham Haym Ofman, the King James Version, Koren, and Artscroll.

Nehemiah and 1 Chronicles 
A few commentators and translations distinguish between the mention in Nehemiah and the mentions in 1 Chronicles. The Vulgate translates vestibulorum, "entrances" (ספפ) in Nehemiah, seniorum concilium, "assembly (אספ) of elders" in 1 Chronicles 26:15, and concilium "assembly (אספ)" in 1 Chronicles 26:17. Pseudo-Solomon b. Isaac on Nehemiah translates the mention there thresholds (ספפ) and pseudo-Solomon b. Isaac on 1 Chronicles translates the mentions there "a place whose name is Asuppim." Pseudo-Solomon b. Isaac on Nehemiah and pseudo-Solomon b. Isaac on Chronicles were written by different people but the King James Version and Artscroll follow the local commentary attributed to Solomon b. Isaac in each case. Robert Alter translates "thresholds" (ספפ) in Nehemiah and "storehouse" (אספ) in 1 Chronicles, as does George Grove.  The New Heart English Bible translates "storehouses" (אספ) in Nehemiah 12:25 and "vestibules" (ספפ) in 1 Chronicles 26:15-17, presumably by accident. Distinguishing the two mentions in translation does not imply two distinct locations, as 2 Kings 22:4 describes, "The silver brought to the House of Yahweh, which the threshold (ספפ) guards gathered (אספ)". The vast majority of scholars agree the mentions in Nehemiah and 1 Chronicles intend the same referent.

Modern consensus 
Most modern translations follow the plain etymology (אספ gather) for "storehouses." Exceptions include: JPS 1985 (which uses ספפ terminate for "vestibules"), Robert Alter's translation (which uses ספפ in Nehemiah 12:25 for "thresholds"), Artscroll (which uses ספפ in Nehemiah 12:25 for "gateposts" and treats it as a proper noun in 1 Chronicles 26:15-17), Koren (which treats it as a proper noun in 1 Chronicles 26:15-17), and the New Heart English Bible (which uses ספפ in 1 Chronicles 26:15-17 for "vestibules"). Most dictionaries do the same, with the exception of Smith's Bible Dictionary (which uses ספפ in Nehemiah 12:25 for "thresholds"). Most modern scholars accepted אספ gather for "storehouses" (see § Proposal of אספ), with exceptions (see § Proposal of סספ and § As a proper noun), though recent research suggests Asuppim is related to Akkadian asuppu and means "insubstantial structures" (see § Akkadian loanword).

Guards at the Asuppim 
Levite guards were stationed at the Asuppim. In Nehemiah, the guards of the Asuppim are given as follows: Mattaniah, Bakbukiah, Obadiah, Meshullam, Talmon, and Akkub. In 1 Chronicles, the guarding of the Asuppim is given to "the sons of Obed-Edom" who guard it "two by two (שנים שנים)".

Some Rabbinic commentators explain that the Temple was only guarded by Levites at night, and that it was an honor guard. Others explain that it was guarded by day as well.

Number of guards 
The Talmud (b. Tamid 27a) discusses the number of guards stationed at the Asuppim. The Mishnah (m. Middot 1:1) had described 21 Levite guard stations at the Temple; this apparently conflicts with 1 Chronicles 26, which lists 20 guards in addition to those "at the Asuppim, two by two (שנים שנים)," a total of 24. Abaye resolves the issue by interpreting שנים שנים as a repetition not to be summed: "At the Asuppim, two, two". Pseudo-Asher b. Jehiel understood Abaye's cryptic statement to imply shifts of two, which explanation was accepted by Isidore Epstein and Matthias Asp. Pseudo-Abraham b. David and the Anonymous German Commentary to b. Tamid understood Abaye to imply one guard at each of two Asuppim, which explanation was accepted by David Altschuler and David Qimḥi. Pseudo-Solomon b. Isaac on b. Tamid understood Abaye to imply a repetition for emphasis, which explanation was accepted by Adin Steinsaltz, Koren, Yaakov Shulevitz, and the Encyclopedia Talmudit.

A variety of other commentators reject Abaye and accept the explanation of the Stam, which is that the three places m. Middot 1:1 assigns to Priestly guards are not included among the 21 Levite stations, and when summed they produce the 24 listed in 1 Chronicles. Menachem Meiri, Levi b. Gershon, and Meir Leibush Wisser assume that they are to be summed, and explain that there were two Levites for each Asop. The Peshitta to 1 Chronicles 26:17 has only one "two (ܬܪܝܢ)" and LXX has only one "two (δύο)". The Vulgate to 1 Chronicles 26:17 has bini et bini, "two and two", which Tremellius shortens to a single bini, "two". Most modern translations of 1 Chronicles 26:17 assume the twos are to be summed, but the New International Version follows pseudo-Asher b. Jehiel's explanation of Abaye.

Guards were not usually stationed individually in the Temple, because it was considered torturous. However, according to the interpretation of Abaye advanced by pseudo-Abraham b. David and the Anonymous German Commentary to b. Tamid (and accepted by David Qimḥi and David Altschuler), the Asuppim guards were each alone; this was permitted either because the Asuppim were close together or because they were located along a public thoroughfare.

Location 
It is clear from MT Nehemiah 12:25 אֲסֻפֵּי הַשְּׁעָרִים Asuppim of the gates that, irrespective of the word's etymology, the Asuppim lay at the gates to the Temple. David Qimḥi, pseudo-Abraham b. David, David Altschuler, and Alexander Bennett M'Grigor assume they were to the south of the Temple based on the context in 1 Chronicles 26, where "The south [gate fell to] Obed-Edom, and the Assupim to his sons" and "for the South, four daily; and for the Asuppim, two by two".

John Lightfoot argues the Asuppim was instead located along the western wall of the Temple, based on the fact that only two gates are named in 1 Chronicles 26, Shallecheth and Parbar, and the Asuppim must be at the most important gates, and these gates are along the western wall. However, פַּרְבָּר parbar, which was left as "Parbar" in the King James Version, was never treated as a proper noun by Rabbinic commentaries, who relied on the opinion of Abbah b. Shela that it is a contraction of כלפי בר k'lapei bar "toward the outside," nor by the VSS, the Targum to 1 Chronicles also having כלפי ברא k'lapei bara "toward the outside" and the Vulgate having cellulis "cells" (though the Peshitta transliterates ܦܪܒܪ), and is no longer seen as a proper noun by most scholars, who instead translate it "colonnade" based on the Persian parallel فَرْوَار farwār.

Apparatus

Notes

References 

Temple Mount